North Van Ship Repair, later known as Pacific Dry Dock was a shipyard in the city of North Vancouver, British Columbia, Canada which built many of the , Fort ships and Victory ships for Britain and Canada during World War II.  Located just west of Lonsdale Avenue adjoining the Burrard Dry Dock, it was eventually absorbed into Burrard.  The site was pulled down in the early 1980s and became the Lonsdale Quay and the Insurance Corporation of British Columbia (ICBC) building.

References  
"Burrard Dry Dock" Mariner Life August 2007
"A Riveted Community: North Vancouver's Wartime Shipbuilding"
"Burrard Dry Dock photograph collection" British Columbia Archival Union List (BCAUL)
"North Vancouver Ship Repair" List of ships built

Shipbuilding companies of Canada
Former defence companies of Canada
Companies based in British Columbia
Defunct manufacturing companies of Canada